Aucoin is a surname of French Belgian origin. Notable people with the surname include:

 Adrian Aucoin (born 1973), Canadian ice hockey player
 Bill Aucoin (1943–2010), American band manager
 Derek Aucoin (born 1970), Canadian baseball pitcher
 Hubert Meen Aucoin (born 1874), Canadian politician
 Vice Admiral Joseph Aucoin, United States Navy, formerly Commander of the 7th Fleet
 Keith Aucoin (born 1978), American ice hockey player
 Kelly AuCoin, American actor
 Kevyn Aucoin (1962–2002), American make-up artist and photographer
 Les AuCoin (born 1942), United States Congressman from Oregon
 Louis M. Aucoin, United Nations Secretary-General Deputy Special Representative for Liberia
 Matthew Aucoin (born 1990), American composer, conductor, pianist and writer
 Peter Aucoin (1943–2011), professor
 Rich Aucoin, Canadian indie rock musician